The 2014 Indian general election in Chhattisgarh was held in three phases on 10, 17 and 24 April 2014.

Result

|- align=center
!style="background-color:#E9E9E9" class="unsortable"|
!style="background-color:#E9E9E9" align=center|Political Party
!style="background-color:#E9E9E9" |Seats won
!style="background-color:#E9E9E9" |Seat change
|-
| 
|align="left"|Bharatiya Janata Party||10||
|-
| 
|align="left"|Indian National Congress||1||
|-
|
|align="left"|Total||11||
|}

List of elected MPs

References

Indian general elections in Chhattisgarh
2010s in Chhattisgarh
2014 Indian general election by state or union territory